Dorothy Carter (born New York City, 1935, died June 7, 2003, in New Orleans) was an American musician. Carter performed contemporary, folk, traditional, medieval, and experimental music with a large collection of stringed instruments such as the hammered dulcimer, zither, psaltery, and hurdy-gurdy. She is regarded as an important figure in the genres of psychedelic folk music and medieval music revival.

Biography
Carter studied classical piano at age six. She later attended Bard College in New York, the London Royal Academy, and Guildhall School of Music in France.

In the early 1970s, Carter was a member of the Central Maine Power Music Company with Robert Rutman and Constance Demby. She moved to Cambridge, Massachusetts, where she continued to collaborate with Rutman, who played his sound sculptures on her second album. She regularly played concerts with Rutman's Steel Cello Ensemble, a collaboration that persisted for decades.

In the 1990s Carter returned to London and founded the all-female revival group Mediæval Bæbes with Katherine Blake of Miranda Sex Garden. The group's 1997 debut album, Salva Nos reached #2 on the classical music charts.

Carter later settled in New Orleans, residing in a live-in studio on the third floor of a warehouse building where she hosted salons. She died in 2003 of an aneurysm. She is survived by a son and daughter, Justin Carter of Los Angeles, California and Celeste Carter of Picayune, Mississippi and a grandson, Damien Helgason.

Appearances 
 2000, Vancouver, BC. Dorothy Carter played hurdy-gurdy at the Vancouver Folk Music Festival. A recording can be heard on the Soundscapes 2000 album.

Discography

As Dorothy Carter
Troubadour (1976)
Waillee Waillee (1978) 
Lonesome Dove (2000)
Dorothy Carter (2003)

With Mediæval Bæbes

Salva Nos (1997)
Worldes Blysse (1998)
The Best of the Mediæval Bæbes (1999, a compilation of tracks from the first two albums)
Undrentide (2000)
The Rose (2002)

References

External links 
 Dorothy Carter on Last FM (illustrations, music, information)

Hammered dulcimer players
Hurdy-gurdy players
Zither players
Virgin Records artists
1935 births
Musicians from New York City
2003 deaths
20th-century American musicians
20th-century American women musicians
21st-century American women